William Donald Dupes (October 9, 1929 – January 8, 2011) was an American football player and coach. He served as the head football coach at Millsaps College in Jackson, Mississippi in 1962 and at Austin Peay State University from 1963 to 1972, compiling a career college football coaching record of 43–62–4.

Head coaching record

College

References

External links
 

1929 births
2011 deaths
American football centers
American football fullbacks
American football guards
American football linebackers
Austin Peay Governors football coaches
Millsaps Majors football coaches
Tennessee Tech Golden Eagles football coaches
Tennessee Tech Golden Eagles football players
High school football coaches in Tennessee
People from Sweetwater, Tennessee
Coaches of American football from Tennessee
Players of American football from Tennessee